Monika Wagner (born 28 February 1965 in Garmisch-Partenkirchen, West Germany) is a German curler. She currently plays third for Andrea Schöpp, who was born eight hours before her in the same hospital.

Wagner has played with Schöpp for most of her international career. She was her lead at the 1980 European Curling Championships where they won the bronze medal. Since then Wagner has been both Schöpp's second and third. With Schöpp, Wagner has won the World Curling Championships in 1988 and 2010, six European Curling Championships (and ) and an Olympic Gold medal (1992).

She was an alternate on the German team that won the 2008 European Mixed Curling Championship.

She was a member of the German team at the 1998 and 2010 Winter Olympics.

References

External links

German female curlers
Sportspeople from Garmisch-Partenkirchen
1965 births
Living people
World curling champions
Olympic curlers of Germany
Curlers at the 1988 Winter Olympics
Curlers at the 1992 Winter Olympics
Curlers at the 1998 Winter Olympics
Medalists at the 1992 Winter Olympics
Curlers at the 2010 Winter Olympics
Olympic gold medalists for Germany
Continental Cup of Curling participants
European curling champions